Perinetti is a surname of Italian origin. Notable people with this surname include:

 Emilio Perinetti (1852-1936), Italian painter
 José Cuneo Perinetti (1887-1977), Uruguayan painter 
 Natalio Perinetti (1900–1985), Argentine football forward 

Italian-language surnames